Mees Kreekels (born 1 November 2001) is a Dutch professional footballer who plays as a defender for Eerste Divisie side Helmond Sport.

Club career
Born in Helmond, Kreekels began his career at the PSV youth academy. On 13 January 2020, he made his professional debut for PSV's reserve side, Jong PSV in an Eerste Divisie match against Jong Ajax. Kreekels was a starter as the match ended 0–0.

On 24 January 2023, Kreekels signed a 1.5-year contract with his hometown club Helmond Sport.

International career
Kreekels made his international debut for the Netherlands at the under-19 level on 8 October 2019 in a 2020 UEFA U-19 Championship qualifier against Moldova U19.

Career statistics

Club

References

External links
Profile at the PSV website

2001 births
Living people
Sportspeople from Helmond
Footballers from North Brabant
Dutch footballers
Netherlands youth international footballers
Association football defenders
Jong PSV players
Helmond Sport players
Eerste Divisie players